The men's C-2 1000 metres event was an open-style, pairs canoeing event conducted as part of the Canoeing at the 1992 Summer Olympics program.

Medalists

Results

Heats
14 teams entered in two heats. The top two finishers from each of the heats advanced directly to the finals and the remaining teams were relegated to the semifinals.

Semifinals
Two semifinals took place. The top two finishers from each semifinal and the fastest third-place finisher advanced directly to the final.

The American's disqualification was not disclosed in the official report.

Final
The final was held on August 8.

The Germans fought off a mid-race challenge from the Danes before winning going away.

References
1992 Summer Olympics official report Volume 5. p. 145. 
Sports-reference.com 1992 C-2 1000 m results.
Wallechinsky, David and Jaime Loucky (2008). "Canoeing: Men's Canadian Doubles 1000 Meters". In The Complete Book of the Olympics: 2008 Edition. London: Aurum Press Limited. p. 484.

Men's C-2 1000
Men's events at the 1992 Summer Olympics